Coleophora subsolana is a moth of the family Coleophoridae. It is found in Mongolia.

References

subsolana
Moths of Asia
Moths described in 1979